Los Rayos (The Rays) (2004) is the second album by Argentine singer-songwriter Vicentico from his solo career. The album received a Latin Grammy Award nomination for Best Singer-Songwriter Album.

Track listing 
All tracks by Vicentico except where noted

 "Los Caminos de la Vida" (The Ways of Life) (Omar Antonio Geles Suárez) – 4:03
 "La Libertad" (The Freedom) – 4:09
 "Las Armas" (The Weapons) – 4:07
 "El Barco" (The Ship) – 3:06
 "El Tonto" (The Fool) – 3:37
 "Tiburón" (Shark) (Ruben Blades) – 3:05
 "Soy Feliz" (I'm Happy) – 3:42
 "El Engaño" (The Deceive) – 3:35
 "La Verdad" (The Truth) – 3:28
 "El Cielo" (The Sky) – 4:31
 "La Nada" (Nothingness) – 3:36
 "La Señal" (The Sign) – 3:52

Personnel 
 Vicentico – vocals, art direction, musical direction, producer
 Dani Buira – drums, percussion
 Daniela Castro – double bass
 Juan E. Scalona – trombone

Guest musicians 
 Flavio Oscar Cianciarulo – bass
 Lucho González – guitar
 Erving Stutz – flugelhorn, trombone, trumpet, wind arrangements
 Julieta Venegas – accordion, piano, vocals

Technical personnel 
 Amadeo Alvarez – production assistant
 Sebastián Arpesella – photography
 Javier Caso – production assistant
 Walter Chacon – engineer, mixing
 Pablo Durand – programming
 Cynthia Lejbowicz – production coordination
 Nora Lezano – photography
 Paco Martin – A&R
 Diego Ortells – programming
 Diego Ramirez – assistant
 Eduardo Rivero – studio assistant
 Alejandro Ros – graphic design
 Afo Verde – A&R, art direction, musical direction, producer
 Carlos Martos Wensell – mastering engineer

References

External links 
 www.vicentico.com
 Los Rayos at MusicBrainz
 [ Los Rayos] at Allmusic

Vicentico albums
2004 albums